Those Who Kill is a Danish crime TV series from 2011, which follows a fictitious unit within Copenhagen Police which specialises in investigating serial murders. The series was aired as five two-part stories in Denmark (i.e. ten episodes in total), but has aired as five feature-length episodes in most other countries. A separate 92 minutes feature film, Fortidens skygge, which forms a continuation and ending of the series, premiered in Danish cinemas on 15 March 2012, and is being aired as the final episode or episodes of the series in many other countries, such as the UK and Germany.

The series is created and written by Elsebeth Egholm and Stefan Jaworski, with various other screenwriters helping out as episode writers, among them Siv Rajendram, Rikke De Fine Licht and Morten Dragsted. Directors have been Birger Larsen, Niels Nørløv and Kasper Barfoed. The series is a Danish-German-Swedish-Norwegian co-production.

Although originally planned to run for several seasons, Danish TV2 announced in October 2011 that there would be no further seasons made, due to falling viewer shares after the first few episodes. TV2 programming manager Keld Reinicke stated that, "We have no plans to continue the series as it never gave us the audience share we expected in Denmark".

Announced in April 2018, Those Who Kill returned to the screens in 2019 on the Viaplay streaming service and the TV3 network across Scandinavia, with a new separate season which starred Kenneth M Christensen and Natalie Madueño.

Cast and characters

Episodes

Broadcast
Those Who Kill has been sold to broadcasters in more than 25 countries.  In Germany 3.8 million viewers watched the final episode on channel ZDF. In the United Kingdom, the series has been shown by commercial channel ITV3, and by the BBC iPlayer.

Remakes

American remake

In January 2012, the A&E television channel announced that it had bought the rights to develop a US version of the series. A pilot episode began filming in Pittsburgh in December 2012, produced by Fox 21 and written by Glen Morgan. The pilot starred Chloë Sevigny as police detective Catherine Jensen, and James D'Arcy as forensic profiler Thomas Schaeffer. In April 2013, A&E announced that it had greenlit a 10-episode first season of the series, which would begin production in Pittsburgh in late 2013. The series premiered on A&E on 3 March 2014.

Although the series received poor critical reviews, it got positive viewer reviews.

A&E pulled the series after poor opening ratings plunged even more for the second episode, then moved it to Lifetime Movie Network (LMN), where it was not renewed for a second season.

Dutch remake
In 2016 A Dutch remake was launched called 'De Jacht' (the hunt). Only six episodes were made and actress Loes Haverkort, who played inspector Lea Smit was nominated for a 'Golden Calf' award in the section 'best actress TV-drama.

References

External links
 Darkness: Those Who Kill (2019) at BBC Programmes
 Blinded: Those Who Kill (2021) at BBC Programmes
 
 

2011 Danish television series debuts
Danish crime television series
Danish drama television series
2010s Danish television series
2011 Danish television series endings
Television shows set in Denmark
Detective television series
Danish-language television shows
TV 2 (Denmark) original programming